The Aztec mouse (Peromyscus aztecus) is a species of rodent in the family Cricetidae, native to southern Mexico and parts of Central America.

Description
The fur is ochre mixed with black over the upper surface of the body, a brighter reddish color at the sides, and pale buff beneath. The tail is also paler on the underside, and often ends with a white tip. The feet are white, with hairs on the soles of the hindfeet, one of the features that allows it to be distinguished from the otherwise similar looking, and more widespread, brush mouse.

Distribution and habitat 
Aztec mice are found in three disjunct regions of southern Mexico, in southern Guatemala and Honduras, and in much of El Salvador. Four subspecies have been identified:

 P. aztecus aztecus - the centers of Veracruz and Guerrero
 P. aztecus cordillerae - El Salvador
 P. aztecus evides - Oaxaca
 P. aztecus oaxacensis - extreme eastern Oaxaca, Chiapas, Guatemala, and Honduras

The mice live in mountainous regions, between  altitude. Here they are found in the limits of humid highland forests, ranging from cloud forests to highland coniferous forest dominated by juniper and pine. They are also found in sugar cane and coffee plantations.

Biology 
Aztec mice primarily eat grasses and seeds, although as much as a third of their diet may consist of insects at certain times of the year, including ants, crickets, beetles, and weevils. Although precise details of their mating habits are unknown, pregnant females have been found from May to November, and litter sizes of up to five have been recorded.

Conservation status 
The Aztec mouse is not a threatened species. Its conservation status is of least concern because its large distribution, a presumed large population, and its tolerance to various kinds of habitats. Since it lives in protected areas and no threat is apparent, it is unlikely to decline to levels of threatened species.

References

Peromyscus
Mammals of Mexico
Rodents of Central America
Rodents of North America
Least concern biota of North America
Mammals described in 1860
Taxonomy articles created by Polbot